The 2002 Four Nations Tournament was an invitational women's football tournament held in China with four national teams participating in a round robin format. It was held in Guangzhou from January 23 to 25, 2002. Olympic champion Norway won the tournament with two wins and one loss, followed by Germany and world champion United States, while the hosts were last despite winning their first game.

Final standings

Match results

References

2002 in women's association football
2002
2002 in Chinese football
2002 in American women's soccer
2002 in Norwegian women's football
2001–02 in German women's football
January 2002 sports events in Asia
Sports competitions in Guangzhou
2002 in Chinese women's sport
Football in Guangzhou